Adenosine diphosphate ribose (ADPR) is an ester molecule formed into chains by the enzyme poly ADP ribose polymerase. ADPR is created from cyclic ADP-ribose (cADPR) by the CD38 enzyme using nicotinamide adenine dinucleotide (NAD+) as a cofactor.

ADPR binds to and activates the TRPM2 ion channel. ADPR is the most potent agonist of the TRPM2 channel. cADPR also binds to TPRM2, and the action of both molecules is synergistic, with both molecules enhancing the action of the other molecule in activating  the TRPM2 channel.

See also
 Adenosine diphosphate
 ADP-ribosylation
 Ribose
 Poly (ADP-ribose) polymerase

References

Nucleotides
Organophosphates
NADH dehydrogenase inhibitors
Phosphate esters